James "Bonecrusher" Smith was born in April 13, 1953 at Magnolia, North Carolina, USA. James "Bonecrusher" Smith is an  American former professional boxer who competed from 1981 to 1999, and held the WBA heavyweight title from 1986 to 1987.

Early life
Smith was born in Magnolia, North Carolina. After graduating from high school, he attended James Sprunt Community College in Kenansville, North Carolina. He earned an associate's degree in Business Administration in 1973. Two years later, he earned a bachelor's degree in Business Administration from Shaw University in Raleigh, North Carolina.

Amateur career
After serving in the US military and working as a prison guard, Smith competed as an amateur compiling a record of 35–4, before turning professional in November 1981.

Professional career
He lost his first fight against James "Broad-Axe" Broad, a world-class amateur and qualifier for the 1980 Olympics who was 2–0 as a pro. The fight was broadcast on ESPN. Smith was dropped in 4 rounds with body shots and counted out.

The following year Smith upset future cruiserweight world champion and southpaw Ricky Parkey, then 2–0 as a pro, by winning a 6-round points decision. After scoring two knockouts, Smith followed up the Parkey win with another upset. An 8-round points decision over Chris McDonald, who was 8–0–1 as a pro and had been a top amateur. He went on to score nine straight knockouts, before traveling to the UK in 1984. There he fought Frank Bruno, who was 21–0 (21 KO), and knocked him out. 

In November 1984, he fought Larry Holmes for the IBF heavyweight championship. Holmes had a record of 45–0 and had won eighteen straight world title fights. Smith was stopped on advice of the doctor in the 12th round, due to a cut. He again was behind on points.

Smith came back in 1985, fighting on Don King undercards. He lost a 10-round decision to 19–0 amateur star and future world champ Tony Tubbs in an eliminator, won a 10-round decision over 18–1 Cuban contender José Ribalta, but then he dropped a wide 12-round decision to ex-world champ Tim Witherspoon in a bid for Witherspoon's NABF belt.

In 1986 he dropped Marvis Frazier, also breaking Frazier's jaw, but lost the 10-round decision. At this time, Bonecrusher began consulting a psychiatrist. In his next fight he beat ex-world champ Mike Weaver in one round. He followed it up with two 10-round decisions over Jesse Ferguson (14–2) and David Bey (15–2).

In December 1986, while preparing for a fight with Mitch "Blood" Green, Don King informed him at short notice that Tony Tubbs had dropped out of his upcoming challenge to WBA champ Tim Witherspoon, and now Smith would be getting a rematch with WItherspoon. He dropped Witherspoon three times in the opening round, scoring a first-round knockout and winning the WBA title in an upset.

With his victory over Witherspoon, Smith took his place in the heavyweight unification series, an ongoing competition being conducted by HBO and King to try to crown an undisputed world heavyweight champion for the first time since the retirement of Muhammad Ali. The victory garnered Smith another fight, where he was to defend his belt against newly crowned WBC champion Mike Tyson in a unification contest. Taking place on March 7, 1987, the bout saw Tyson beat Smith to the punch in nearly every round, while Smith resorted to holding to keep himself in the fight. The decision saw Smith lose eleven rounds on two scorecards and all twelve on another.

Final years
He returned to the ring for a few months. He took on Brazilian contender Adilson "Maguila" Rodrigues in São Paulo, losing by split decision.

In 1989, now aged 36, he took on the Jamaican-Canadian Donovan (Razor) Ruddock. Ruddock won by knockout in the 7th round. Smith announced his retirement after the loss and said he would now pursue politics.

Smith was back in the ring only two months later, KOing journeyman Calvin Jones and followed up with three more knockouts before being matched with former victim Mike Weaver in a battle of hard hitting ex-champs. This time, Smith was resigned to having to win a dull 12 round points decision over Weaver, although he did score a knockdown in a brief moment of excitement. He also earned the WBA Americas belt, and a world ranking.

After a year layoff he was back, now aged 38, and scored six knockouts, including a notable 8-round knockout of the cement-skulled journeyman Everett (Bigfoot) Martin (who had just taken George Foreman the distance), and a first-round knockout of equally hard hitting ex-contender Jeff Sims.

However, he lost his world ranking and all his momentum in November 1991 when he dropped a shocking 10-round decision to club fighter Levi Billups who had a patchy 15–5 record. Smith looked under-prepared as he was banged around and generally outhustled by Billups. He rallied to knock down the underdog in the 9th; however, it was too little too late.

Still active in 1992, now aged 39 and with a 33–9–1 record, Smith regained some credibility with a 10-round decision over Mark Wills. His old agitator Don King gave him another opportunity on one of his undercards and matched him with warhorse Greg Page, in a battle of two ex-champs. In the opening round Bonecrusher tried to rush Page as he had done Witherspoon, however he was decked himself for his efforts, and was outpunched by Page over the 10 round distance.

In 1993 Smith lost to undefeated southpaw and #1 contender Michael Moorer. The paying audience jeered the two passive fighters through to the 10 round finish, where Smith lost a lopsided decision.

Smith competed in the One-Night Heavyweight Tournament in Bay St Louis (not included in the official record, counted as show), where a group of heavies of varying quality would fight a series of 3 round fights with the winner being awarded one million dollars. He beat Lester Jackson and Marshall Tillman, before losing in the semi-final to Romanian prospect Daniel Dăncuţă. Smith's old buddy Tony (TNT) Tubbs eventually won.

In 1994 he was matched with power punching Tyson-lookalike Lionel Butler, who was highly ranked and on a red-hot string of knockouts. Smith collapsed in 3 rounds, having offered little resistance.

Later that year he traveled to Europe to drop a points decision to German Axel Schulz, and in Denmark he was stopped in 5 rounds due to a cut from a headbutt, courtesy of Brian Nielsen. Smith was overweight for both of these fights, and his days as a contender were definitely over.

He fought on and off for a few more years. In 1998, he traveled to Australia to battle Joe Bugner for the WBF Heavyweight Championship, but had to retire after one round when his shoulder popped out. The same injury ended a fight in 1999 with former world champion Larry Holmes. After this loss, Smith retired at the age of 46 and with a record of 44–17–1 (32 KOs).

In 1995, Smith helped establish the North Carolina Boxing Commission. He served as its first chairman.

Life after boxing
Smith became an ordained minister in 1996 and dedicated his life to helping young people stay clear of crime and drugs. Three years later, he retired from boxing.

In 2004 Smith started the non-profit Champion For Kids Inc. to provide scholarships to high school students.

Smith began working as a recruiter and the Director of Intramural Athletics for Sandhills Community College in June 2005.

He now works for the Working Families Party in New York City.
He now lives in Myrtle Beach, South Carolina.

Deeply committed to helping impoverished fighters, Smith was a guest at the Ring 10 Veterans Boxing Foundation 2nd Annual Fundraiser in 2012 where he expressed his support of initiatives to better provide for those in need.

Smith is currently working with organizers to establish the Legend's of Boxing Hall of fame in Myrtle Beach, South Carolina.

Professional boxing record

References

External links

1953 births
Living people
World heavyweight boxing champions
World Boxing Association champions
Shaw University alumni
People from Duplin County, North Carolina
Boxers from North Carolina
American male boxers